Rocka Rolla is the debut studio album by English heavy metal band Judas Priest, released on 6 September 1974 by Gull Records. It was produced by Rodger Bain, who had made a name for himself as the producer of Black Sabbath's first three albums. It is the only album to feature drummer John Hinch.

Background
According to the band, the entire album was played live in the studio rather than having individual musicians record alone.

According to the band there were technical problems in the studio, resulting in poor sound quality and a hiss through the album. Guitarist Glenn Tipton had just joined when recording of Rocka Rolla began; his only songwriting contributions accepted by producer Rodger Bain were on the title track and "Run of the Mill". He did come up with the songs "Tyrant", "Epitaph", and "Ripper", but Bain considered them not commercial enough and rejected them. Bain also rejected the concert staple "Whiskey Woman" which later, with contributions from Tipton, morphed into "Victim of Changes". These songs were eventually all included on their next album, Sad Wings of Destiny. In addition, "Winter", "Deep Freeze" and "Winter Retreat" form a suite, but are listed as separate tracks and divided as such on some versions of the CD release.

Several of the songs on the album feature contributions from the band's previous frontman Al Atkins and had been regular parts of their live performances in Manchester, where the band had achieved a cult following during the previous few years. The track "Caviar and Meths" was originally a 14-minute effort penned by Atkins, Downing, and Hill but due to time constraints, only the intro was recorded for the album. A longer version of the song appears on Atkins's 1998 album Victim of Changes. That album also contains covers of "Winter" and "Never Satisfied".

At this time, the band had not yet developed their signature look of leather and studs. They had appeared on British television show The Old Grey Whistle Test in 1975, performing "Rocka Rolla" and "Dreamer Deceiver", and their wardrobe was very "hippified" as journalist Malcolm Dome put it. This footage was included on the Electric Eye DVD. In addition, the album is more blues/hard rock oriented than their later releases, and also has some slight progressive rock influences that would continue through to Stained Class, but to a lesser extent, and would be abandoned in later releases. This makes the album's style virtually unrecognizable when compared with later Priest albums, although "Rocka Rolla" does feature dual guitars, and "Run of the Mill" is the first song that was explicitly designed for Halford's, rather than Atkins', vocal range.

Drummer John Hinch was dismissed in 1975 before the next record was recorded. Tipton would later refer to him as being "musically inadequate" for the band's future plans.

The album was reissued several times over the years, and in 1984 it was issued with a different sleeve design. The original "bottle cap" album cover art was initially intended by designer John Pasche for use with an unspecified Rolling Stones album. The band had filed a lawsuit with the Coca-Cola company. The re-issue cover art (by artist Melvyn Grant, and originally used as the cover for the novel The Steel Tsar) was also used for the US cover of Ballistix for the TurboGrafx-16 and Amiga.

Most of the songs from Rocka Rolla have not been performed by Judas Priest live since the mid-late 1970s, although Halford's solo band performed "Never Satisfied" during live shows in 2003, and the same song was part of the setlist of the Epitaph World Tour. "Rocka Rolla" was performed for the first time since 1976 at Bloodstock Open Air in 2021.

The tour for Rocka Rolla was Judas Priest's first international tour with dates in Germany, Holland, Norway and Denmark including one show at Hotel Klubben in Tønsberg, one hour from Oslo, Norway which scored them a somewhat negative review in the local press.

Reception

The album was released to very little reception selling "only a few thousand copies". Because it flopped, the band found themselves in dire financial straits. In particular, they talked of nights in which they were starving and didn't know when they were going to get their next meal. They tried to enter into an agreement with Gull Records to pay them £50 a week, but Gull, which was also suffering economic woes, refused. In a retrospective review, AllMusic gave Rocka Rolla a rating of 2.5 out of five stars, and said that while it was a "sketchy and underfocused debut", the album "definitely hints at Judas Priest's potential and originality".

Track listing 

The original UK LP has a longer version of "Rocka Rolla" than the version used for the US LP release, and most CD releases. It has an extra verse and chorus at the beginning of the song.

The very rare first printing of the UK LP has the words "Thanks for the words Al!" printed last in the credits in the blue circle on the back cover. This, presumably a reference to original singer Al Atkins, has been removed on other versions of the Gull vinyl.

On some versions of the CD release, "Rocka Rolla" is timed at 4:00 and "Winter" at 0:45, becoming a mashup but remaining on separate tracks. Some releases, e.g. Hero, Hero also combine "Winter", "Deep Freeze" and "Winter Retreat" into one track. The iTunes version combines those three plus "Cheater" into one track.

The version of "Diamonds & Rust" that appears on the re-release is actually from the Sad Wings of Destiny sessions and not the version that appears on Sin After Sin. It was probably included to provide interest in Rocka Rolla, an album that would have been unknown to many of the band's fans due to the band not playing songs from it live after the 1970s.

Rocka Rolla features Judas Priest's longest track, "Run of the Mill" (8:34), prior to "Cathedral Spires" (9:17) from Jugulator in 1997. It is also the longest track co-written by Halford, Downing and Tipton prior to "Lochness" (13:28) from Angel of Retribution in 2005.

Rocka Rolla was covered by black metal swedish band Vondur in the EP The Galactic Rock n' Roll Empire

Personnel
Judas Priest
Rob Halford – vocals, harmonica
Glenn Tipton – guitars, synthesizers, backing vocals
K. K. Downing – guitars
Ian Hill – bass guitar
John Hinch – drums

Production
Produced by Rodger Bain
Engineered by Vic Smith
Cover concept by John Pasche; photo by Bryce Atwell
Band photographs by Alan Johnson

References

1974 debut albums
Albums produced by Rodger Bain
Albums recorded at Trident Studios
Judas Priest albums